Year 1061 (MLXI) was a common year starting on Monday (link will display the full calendar) of the Julian calendar.

Events 
 By place 

 Europe 
 Spring – Robert de Grandmesnil, his nephew Berengar, half-sister Judith (future wife of Roger I), and eleven monks of the Abbey of Saint-Evroul, are banished by Duke William II (the Bastard) of Normandy for violence, and travel to Southern Italy.
 Summer – Norman forces led by Duke Robert Guiscard and his brother Roger I invade Sicily. They land unseen during the night and surprise the Saracen army. Guiscard conquers Messina and marches into central Sicily.
 June 28 – Count Floris I is ambushed on a retreat from Zaltbommel and killed by German troops at Nederhemert. Most of West Frisia (later part of the County of Holland) is conquered and annexed by the Holy Roman Empire.
 Sosols (a tribe in Estonia) destroy the Kievan Rus' fortification of Yuryev in Tartu, and carry out a raid on Pskov.

 Africa 
 Sultan Yusuf ibn Tashfin succeeds to the throne of Morocco, following the Almoravid conquest.

 By topic 

 Religion 
July 27 – Pope Nicholas II dies after a 2-year pontificate at Florence. He is succeeded by Alexander II as the 156th pope of the Catholic Church in Rome. 
 The Speyer Cathedral is consecrated in Speyer (modern Germany).

Births 
 Al-Maziri, Zirid imam, jurist and scholar (d. 1141)
 Al-Tughrai, Persian poet and alchemist (d. 1121)
 Roger Borsa, duke of Apulia and Calabria (or 1060)
 William II (the German), count of Burgundy (d. 1125)
 Wuyashu, chieftain of the Wanyan tribe (d. 1113)

Deaths 
 January 28 – Spytihněv II, duke of Bohemia (b. 1031)
 May 5 – Humbert of Moyenmoutier, French cardinal
 June 28 – Floris I, count of Friesland (west of the Vlie)
 July 13 – Beatrice I, German abbess of Quedlinburg (b. 1037)
 July 27 – Nicholas II, pope of the Catholic Church
 Abu Sa'id Gardezi, Persian geographer and historian
 Adelmann, bishop of Brescia (approximate date)
 Ali ibn Ridwan, Arab physician and astronomer
 Burgheard, English nobleman
 Burkhard I (or Burchardus), German nobleman
 Conrad III (or Konrad III), German nobleman
 Henry I (or Heinrich I), German count palatine
 Rajaraja Narendra, Indian ruler (b. 1022)
 Rúaidhri Ua Flaithbheartaigh, king of Iar Connacht
 Song Qi, Chinese statesman and historian (b. 998)

References